Franciscan missions may refer to the following: 

 Franciscan missions to the Maya 
 Franciscan Missions in the Sierra Gorda of Querétaro
 Spanish missions in California, operated by the Franciscans in Alta California
 Spanish missions in New Mexico